USS Seawolf (SSN-21), is a nuclear-powered fast attack submarine and the lead ship of her class. She is the fourth submarine of the United States Navy named for the seawolf, a solitary fish with strong, prominent teeth that give it a savage look.

Construction
The contract to build Seawolf was awarded to the Electric Boat Division of General Dynamics on 9 January 1989 and her keel was laid down on 25 October 1989. She was launched on 24 June 1995, sponsored by Mrs. Margaret Dalton, and commissioned on 19 July 1997.  The 7-year 9-month time period from keel laying to commissioning is the longest for a submarine in the U.S. Navy.

Adding support personnel as well as ship's crew, there are 140 personnel assigned or attached to Seawolf.

History

Seawolf is featured in a 1998 episode of the documentary Super Structures of the World: Seawolf. The program followed her construction and sea trials.

On 22 July 2007, Seawolf transferred from her previous homeport of Naval Submarine Base New London in Groton, Connecticut, to Naval Base Kitsap, Washington.

In 2015, Seawolf was deployed to the Arctic region for six months.

In July 2020 Seawolf deployed into the Arctic area of responsibility. She conducted special operations and pulled into multiple European ports. Port calls included HMNB Clyde in Faslane Scotland, and Gibraltar, and briefly in Tromsø, Norway. Seawolfs deployment was the first US Navy deployment during the coronavirus pandemic.

Awards
1997
 Secretary of the Navy Letter of Commendation (1995–1997)

2001
Battle Efficiency "E" Ribbon

2002
Global War on Terrorism Expeditionary Medal (2002–2011)

2004
Battle Efficiency "E" Ribbon

2007
Tactical White "T"
Battle Efficiency "E" Ribbon
Marjorie Sterrett Battleship Fund Award
Meritorious Unit Commendation

2009
Navy Unit Commendation

2014
Battle Efficiency "E" Ribbon
Weapons "W"
Navigation Red and Green "N"
Supply Blue "E"
Personnel "P"

2015
Battle Efficiency "E" Ribbon
Weapons "W"
Navigation Red and Green "N"
Supply Blue "E"
Engineering Red "E"
2020

Battle Efficiency "E" Ribbon
Weapons "W"
Navigation Red and Green "N"
Supply Blue "E"
Navy Expeditionary Medal
Arctic Service Ribbon
Navy and Marine Corps Sea Service Deployment Ribbon (2X)
Navy Meritorious Unit Commendation 
Arleigh Burke Trophy

References

External links

 

Ships built in Groton, Connecticut
Seawolf-class submarines
Nuclear submarines of the United States Navy
1995 ships
Submarines of the United States